Yegorova is a rural locality (a village) in Krasnovishersky District, Perm Krai, Russia. The population was 2 as of 2010.

Geography 
Yegorova is located 64 km southeast of Krasnovishersk (the district's administrative centre) by road. Simanova is the nearest rural locality.

References 

Rural localities in Krasnovishersky District